The 2019–20 Arizona State Sun Devils women's basketball team represents Arizona State University during the 2019–20 NCAA Division I women's basketball season. The Sun Devils, led by twenty third year head coach Charli Turner Thorne, play their games at Desert Financial Arena and are members of the Pac-12 Conference.

Roster

Schedule

|-
!colspan=9 style=| Non-conference regular season

|-
!colspan=9 style=| Pac-12 regular season

|-
!colspan=9 style=| Pac-12 Women's Tournament

Rankings

^Coaches' Poll did not release a second poll at the same time as the AP.

See also
2019–20 Arizona State Sun Devils men's basketball team

References

Arizona State Sun Devils women's basketball seasons
Arizona State
Arizona State Sun Devils women's basketball
Arizona State Sun Devils women's basketball